Harlan M. Krumholz, MD, SM (March 21, 1958–) is an American cardiologist, leading research scientist, and the Harold H. Hines, Jr. Professor of Medicine at Yale School of Medicine, where he has been on faculty since 1992. A pioneer in the development of the field of outcomes research, his groundbreaking contributions to science have directly led to improvements in healthcare outcomes for patients and populations. He is an international expert in the science to evaluate and improve the quality and efficiency of care, reduce disparities, improve integrity in medical research, promote better health policies and regulations, and promote patient-centeredness in research and clinical care. He is the founder and director of the Yale New Haven Hospital Center for Outcomes Research and Evaluation (CORE).

Early life and education
Krumholz was born in St. Louis, Missouri. He attended Meadowdale High School in Dayton, Ohio. He graduated magna cum laude with a Bachelor of Science degree in Biology from Yale College in 1980. He earned his medical degree from Harvard University in 1985, where his advisor was Lee Goldman. He completed his residency in Internal Medicine at the University of California, San Francisco, where he was Chief Resident in 1989. He completed his cardiology fellowship at Beth Israel Hospital in Boston. He graduated with a Master's degree in Health Policy and Management from the Harvard School of Public Health in 1992.

Original research
Krumholz has published more than 1000 articles and has an H-index over 200. He is consistently on Clarivate’s list of the most Highly Cited Researchers and is ranked 31st in the 2022 edition of the Top 1000 Scientists in the Field of Medicine. His work spans a wide range of medicine, with a focus on cardiovascular medicine. His discoveries and their application have impacted the approach to disparities, to sex and gender research, to the evaluation of digital health tools, to the utilization and organization of novel, real-world data sources, to the definition of clinical conditions, to recovery after hospitalization. In many cases, these studies required the development of new methodological approaches or novel strategies for implementation. The driving themes of his work are to improve the effectiveness, efficiency, equity, patient-centeredness, safety, and timeliness of health care. He has collaborated with basic scientists, data scientists, statisticians, and social scientists to derive approaches to address challenging issues in medicine. His work has pioneered new assays to evaluate clinical care and novel methods to identify strategies to improve care and position patients to achieve better outcomes.

Currently, through work with statisticians, mathematicians, and computer scientists, Krumholz is exploring the ways that artificial intelligence and machine learning techniques have the capacity to transform clinical medicine by leveraging digital real-world data. Efforts in this area include the application of data from electronic health records, which provide comprehensive and timely access to clinical information, to quality improvement research; the use of machine learning models for individualized assessments of patient risk, such as the ability to better identify which patients may be more likely to develop complications after surgery, or those who may be more likely to be readmitted to the hospital after hospitalization for heart failure; and investigation of the role that wearable devices might have in improving care for chronic conditions such as high blood pressure.

Development of outcomes research 
Krumholz has played a major role in advancing the field of outcomes research. Eisenberg and Clancy introduced the concept of outcomes research, building on the work of John Wennberg and others. They wrote that outcomes research was ‘the study of the end results of health services that takes patients’ experiences, preferences and values into account—and is intended to provide scientific evidence relating to decisions made by all who participate in health care.’ Krumholz expanded the scope of outcomes research into cardiovascular research, founding or co-founding the AHA Quality of Care and Outcomes Research Annual Conference and the AHA Quality of Care and Outcomes Research Council. He was the founding editor of Circulation: Cardiovascular Quality and Outcomes. He was a founding Governor and one of three researchers of the Patient-Centered Outcomes Research Institute. He has trained generations of investigators in outcomes research and founded the Center for Outcomes Research and Evaluation (CORE) at Yale New Haven Hospital. Krumholz led a K12 faculty program in outcomes research at Yale sponsored by the Agency for Healthcare Research and Quality.

Quality improvement
Krumholz has played a leading role in improving the quality of care, particularly for people with cardiovascular disease. He was a central figure with the national Health Care Financing Administration (now the Centers for Medicare & Medicaid Service (CMS)) Cooperative Cardiovascular Project, which pioneered the evaluation of care practices throughout the country and initiated programs to address shortfalls. The initial results showed that most people were not treated according to the best evidence and the national practice guidelines. The work resulted in partnerships with the American College of Cardiology, the AHA, hospital consortia, and others to initiate programs to improve care. Notably, the performance indicators, such as the use of aspirin and beta-blockers, improved and death rates declined.

The work to improve the timeliness of heart attack care was a particular success. The use of medications and procedures to open arteries that had suddenly closed and were causing a heart attack was a major advance. However, the success of therapy depended importantly on the speed with which the treatment could be provided. In the early 2000s, more than a decade after these treatments became mainstream, there was evidence of marked delays in treatment, mitigating the potential benefits. Krumholz, leveraging a grant from the National Institutes of Health, worked with a multidisciplinary team to identify factors responsible for the delays. Working with Elizabeth Bradley, the team develop a mixed methods approach based on identifying positive deviance, and ultimately identified several key actions that could reliably improve times. Krumholz then led the American College of Cardiology Door-to-Balloon Alliance. The door-to-balloon time was the period between when the patient arrived at the hospital and definitive treatment to open the artery occurred. The national effort, in concert with Mission: Lifeline by the AHA, dramatically reduced the treatment times across the country.

Krumholz has also led efforts to develop metrics used by the federal government and professional societies to measure, publicly report, and improve health care. The goals of public reporting are to provide information to American consumers who are making healthcare decisions, and to encourage hospitals to evaluate and improve the quality of patient care. This wide-ranging work included the evaluation of trends in care for several common conditions and procedures such as stroke, heart attack, heart failure, pneumonia, and joint replacement; the examination of disparities in access to and quality of care; and the investigation of geographic variation in quality of care. It has also included communications with stakeholders about hospital quality.

Krumholz led measures that were ultimately incorporated into federal legislation, including the Affordable Care Act, to publicly report clinical performance and provide incentives for high-quality care. Krumholz has also led efforts to improve health care quality in other countries, including Egypt and China. In China, he launched national collaborations with the National Center for Cardiovascular Diseases in Beijing and with Fuwai Hospital, one of China’s leading cardiovascular institutions.

Open science
Krumholz is a vocal proponent of open science and initiated the Institute of Medicine’s first meeting on open science. He co-founded, with Joseph Ross, the Yale Open Data Access (YODA) Projec t, which began by facilitating the sharing of Medtronic trial data. The principles of the sharing were that anyone could request the data, the requirement was that there was a pre-specified research question, and that Medtronic could not play a role in deciding about data access. Medtronic did not continue its data sharing, but the YODA project now is the platform that shares all the Johnson & Johnson clinical trial data, as well as some others.

Training
Krumholz has trained a generation of clinical scientists and policymakers, many of whom hold prominent positions in academia, government, and industry. He led the Robert Wood Johnson Foundation Clinical Scholars Program—the Foundation’s flagship training program—from 1996–2017, when the program was discontinued. In 2003, he designed and led the Program’s transition from a traditional academic fellowship to one that emphasized partnerships across the healthcare ecosystem and particularly with patients and the community—as well as a focus on how the scholarship could be translated to improve people’s health.

Disparities and equity
Krumholz has produced hundreds of studies on the topic of disparity and equity. His focus on this topic has illuminated gaps in quality and outcomes by sex, race/ethnicity, and geography. In 2007, he launched a grant funded by the National Institutes of Health on heart disease in young women, which produced considerable scholarship on factors leading to disparities in risk. He introduced the idea that differential mortality by race/ethnicity in the United States should be a federal metric for which the country should be accountable.

Integrity
Krumholz has been a proponent of better ethical standards in medicine. He was at the forefront of greater disclosure of potential conflicts of interest. He participated in Vioxx litigation on behalf of plaintiffs and testified in several high-profile trials with Mark Lanier. The litigation, and the discovery, led to several seminal publications on ethical breaches by researchers and industry. He has also participated in litigation with the US Department of Justice related to the inappropriate use of implantable cardioverter defibrillators (ICDs).

Publishing
Krumholz was the founding editor of the AHA journal Circulation: Cardiovascular Quality and Outcomes and served from 2008–2016. For the past two decades, he has been an editor of Journal Watch Cardiology, a publication of the Massachusetts Medical Society. He was also the founding editor of CardioExchange, a practice community of the New England Journal of Medicine for medical professionals. He sits on many editorial boards and is on the advisory committee of Springer, the publisher of the Nature journals. He has published often in national news outlets including the New York Times and the Washington Post. He is currently leading a podcast, with Howard Forman, called Health and Veritas. Krumholz is the author of two books—No Ifs, Ands, or Butts: The Smoker’s Guide to Quitting (1993) and The Expert Guide to Beating Heart Disease (2005).

Preprints
Krumholz is a strong proponent of preprint servers in medicine and is a co-founder of medRxiv. In 2017, in a plenary talk at the Congress on Peer Review and Scientific Publication, he announced the intent to launch a preprint server for clinical research. Subsequently, he and Joseph Ross, in collaboration with Cold Spring Harbor Laboratories and The BMJ, launched medRxiv in June 2019.

Entrepreneurism and digital health
In 2015, Krumholz co-founded, with Leslie Krumholz, HugoHealth, a cloud-based personal healthcare platform designed to empower people through the secure acquisition and management of their digital health data. In 2019, he co-founded, with Wade Schulz, Refactor Health, an enterprise healthcare artificial intelligence-augmented knowledge platform. In 2020, Krumholz joined F-Prime as a part-time advisor. He is also an advisor to Reality Labs, Tesseract/4Catalyst, and Element Science.

COVID
Krumholz has served many roles during the COVID pandemic. He was a member of the ReOpen Connecticut Committee, chaired by Indra Nooyi. He has written opinion pieces and appeared on national news programs. He has published more than 30 articles on the pandemic. He led a federally-funded study on fatality and hospitalization rates, in collaboration with Gallup and Quest—and the Connecticut Department of Public Health. In work with Jeremy Faust and investigators at CORE, he pioneered new approaches to measuring excess mortality that was adopted by the Centers for Disease Control and Prevention.

Opinion pieces
Krumholz has published a wide array of influential opinion pieces. For example, he developed the idea that hospitalization caused allostatic stress and produced pathology and labeled the condition post-hospital syndrome. He introduced the idea that informed consent should evolve to become part of shared decision-making. He wrote a highly read piece encouraging young scientists to question conventional wisdom and be brave in the face of resistance. In a series of contributions, he argued for the importance of open science and improved medical communication. In others, he wrote about integrity issues in medicine and the need for more transparency and accountability. He has argued that clinical scientists need to elevate the value of information they produce and that funding agencies need to reform their application processes. He published his graduation address to the Columbia medical school class, in which he said: ‘Change the balance of power. Put people first. Join me in putting the conception of a patient to rest and ushering in a notion of people who we can engage, empower, and strengthen as partners. We are not there to impose our values, we are there to help them pursue a course that is consistent with their wishes.’ In an address as the American Heart Association (AHA) 2020 Distinguished Lecturer, he laid out a roadmap for the future of cardiovascular outcomes research.

Professional activities and awards
Krumholz was the recipient of the AHA Distinguished Scientist Award (2010), Distinguished Achievement Award (2011), and Clinical Research Prize (2019). He was elected as a member of the National Academy of Medicine in 2007. He was a founding Governor of the Patient-Centered Outcomes Research Institute (PCORI), where he developed the idea, with Francis Collins, for the PCORI Clinical Data Research Network (now PCORnet) and Patient-Powered Research Network. He was also a member of the Advisory Committee to the Director of the National Institutes of Health. Krumholz was a 2014 recipient of the Friendship Award, China’s highest award given to foreign experts who have made outstanding contributions to the country's economic and social progress. In 2017, he was the Paul Wood Lecturer at the annual conference of the British Cardiovascular Society.

References

External links

Living people
American cardiologists
Harvard Medical School alumni
Yale University alumni
Yale School of Medicine faculty
Members of the National Academy of Medicine
Year of birth missing (living people)
Harvard School of Public Health alumni